The Wasserkuppen Rhön or Wasserkuppenrhön, named after its highest peak, also the highest summit in the entire Rhön Mountains, the Wasserkuppe, is an exposed highland ridge and natural region in the Hessian county of Fulda and Bavarian county of Rhön-Grabfeld. Together with the Long Rhön and its eastern flank it forms the Central Rhön. The Red Moor lies within this natural region.

Natural region grouping 
The name Wasserkuppenrhön was defined in 1968 as part of the natural regional division of Germany (M = 1:200,000) as a natural region and grouped as follows:
(to 35 East Hesse Highlands)
(to 354 High Rhön)
(to 354.1 Central Rhön)
354.10 Wasserkuppen Rhön

In the south the region is rather uniform, in the north and northwest it is dominated by foothills and isolated peaks. The land is almost treeless in the north whereas, in the south, coniferous and mixed woods form part of the landscape.

Mountains 
The following mountains - sorted by height in metres above sea level (NHN) lie within the Wasserkuppen Rhön:
 Wasserkuppe (950.0 m), between Abtsroda and Obernhausen
 Abtsrodaer Kuppe (904.8 m), north spur of the Wasserkuppe
 Pferdskopf (874.9 m), near Obernhausen
 Mathesberg (831.8 m), near Wüstensachsen
 Schafstein (831.8 m), near Wüstensachsen
 Eubeberg (ca. 820 m), near Obernhausen
 Ehrenberg (816.5 m), near Ehrenberg
 Feldberg (815.2 m), near Obernhausen
 Kesselstein (ca. 800 m), near Mosbach
 Weiherberg (785.7 m), near Abtsroda and Dietges

References 

Rhön Mountains
Mountain ranges of Hesse
Rhön-Grabfeld
Fulda (district)
Mountain ranges of Bavaria
Natural regions of the East Hesse Highlands